Janulus pompylius was a species of air-breathing land snail, a terrestrial pulmonate gastropod mollusk in the family Gastrodontidae. This species is now considered to be extinct.

Distribution 
This species was endemic to the island of La Palma, in the Canary Islands.

References

Endemic fauna of the Canary Islands
 
Extinct gastropods
Gastropods described in 1852